Lampanyctus crocodilus, the jewel lanternfish, is a lanternfish of the family Myctophidae, found in west Mediterranean Sea and north Atlantic Ocean (above 50° N). Bathypelagic between 400 and 2000 m.

References
 TORTONESE E., Osteichthyes - Fauna d'Italia vol. XI, Calderini, 1975. Bologna, Italy.
 COSTA F., Atlante dei pesci dei mari italiani, Mursia, 1991. Milano, Italy.
 

jewel lanternfish
Fish of the North Atlantic
Fish of the Mediterranean Sea
jewel lanternfish
Taxa named by Antoine Risso